Charles Lindsay O'Brien (born 26 March 1955) is a former Australian race car driver. From 1976 to 2003, he held the record for being the youngest winner of an Australian Touring Car Championship round.

Career results

Complete Australian Touring Car Championship results
(key) (Races in bold indicate pole position) (Races in italics indicate fastest lap)

Complete World Touring Car Championship results
(key) (Races in bold indicate pole position) (Races in italics indicate fastest lap)

† Not registered for series & points

Complete Bathurst 1000 results

References

 Driver Database stats

1955 births
Atlantic Championship drivers
Australian people of Irish descent
Australian Touring Car Championship drivers
Living people
Sportspeople from the Gold Coast, Queensland
Racing drivers from Queensland
Supercars Championship drivers
World Touring Car Championship drivers
Place of birth missing (living people)
Australian Endurance Championship drivers
BMW M drivers
Dick Johnson Racing drivers